"I Wanna Be Around" is a popular song. In the lyrics, the singer declares that he "wants to be around" when the woman who spurned him inevitably gets her heart broken. The song is credited to Sadie Vimmerstedt and Johnny Mercer.

Origins
Vimmerstedt was a grandmother and housewife and a beautician in Youngstown, Ohio, who sent Mercer an idea for the song in 1957, as well as giving Mercer the opening line ("I want to be around to pick up the pieces, when somebody breaks your heart"). She was inspired by Frank Sinatra divorcing his first wife in order to marry Ava Gardner, only to then see Gardner leave Sinatra. Not knowing exactly where to send her letter to, Vimmerstedt simply addressed it to 'Johnny Mercer...Songwriter...New York, NY'. The post office forwarded it to ASCAP, who in turn passed it along to Mercer, who was a member of the organization. Mercer wrote the song and agreed to share 1/3 of the royalties and credits with Vimmerstedt. The song was published in 1962.

Notable cover versions
Tony Bennett's 1963 recording was the first version of the song to reach the charts (number 14 pop during a 14-week stay in 1963, number 5 easy listening in 1963). This was included on his 1963 album of that name and has appeared in several films, including The Freshman (1990). Bennett later recorded a new version of the song in a duet with Bono which was included on his album Duets: An American Classic (2006).

Many other singers have covered the song including:
Aretha Franklin - for her album Laughing on the Outside (1963)
The Beach Boys - for their unfinished Smile album (1966), and later on Brian Wilson Presents Smile
Bobby Darin - included on his album Venice Blue (1965)
Brenda Lee - ..."Let Me Sing" (1963)
Dinah Washington - for the album Dinah '63 (1963)
Eydie Gorme - Don't Go to Strangers (1966)
Frank Sinatra - It Might as Well Be Swing (1964)
Julie London - The End of the World (1963)
Michael Buble - Nobody but Me (2016)
Patti Page - Say Wonderful Things (1963)
Perry Como - The Songs I Love (1963)
Terri Gibbs for her 1981 album I'm a Lady from which it was released as a single to reach number 38 C&W.
Tony Hadley - "Passing Strangers" (2006)
Térez Montcalm - “Voodoo” (2007)

References

Songs with lyrics by Johnny Mercer
Songs written by Johnny Mercer
Tony Bennett songs
1959 songs
Patti Page songs
1963 singles
The Beach Boys songs
Aretha Franklin songs
Peggy Lee songs
Frank Sinatra songs
Terri Gibbs songs
Pop ballads